Petrus Franciscus Greive (25 March 1811 in Amsterdam – 4 November 1872 in Amsterdam) was a Dutch painter and lithographer.

Biography
He studied with Jean Augustin Daiwaille, Jan Willem Pieneman and Christiaan Julius Lodewijk Portman (1799–1868) at the Rijksakademie in Amsterdam. Later, he taught there and was a member of Arti et Amicitiae. His style was based on that of the old Dutch Masters.

He was so devoted to his teaching that his own work suffered. His many notable students included August Allebé, Meijer de Haan, Jan Jacob Lodewijk ten Kate, Hein Kever, Betsy Repelius, Hendrik Jacobus Scholten and his nephew, Johan Conrad Greive.

References

External links

Petrus Franciscus Greive on Artnet

1811 births
1872 deaths
19th-century Dutch painters
Dutch male painters
Painters from Amsterdam
Dutch genre painters
19th-century Dutch male artists